Baranqur (also Romanized as Baranqūr; also known as Paranghoor, Parangu, Paranqūr, and Peranqūr) is a village in Soltaniyeh Rural District, Soltaniyeh District, Abhar County, Zanjan Province, Iran. At the 2006 census, its population was 160, in 35 families.

References 

Populated places in Abhar County